"Start All Over Again" is a song written by Chris Hillman and Steve Hill and recorded by the American country music group The Desert Rose Band.  It was released in November 1989 as the first single from the album Pages of Life. The song reached number 6 on the Billboard Hot Country Singles & Tracks chart.

Chart performance

Year-end charts

References

1990 singles
The Desert Rose Band songs
Songs written by Chris Hillman
Song recordings produced by Paul Worley
MCA Records singles
Curb Records singles
1989 songs